Aldoga is a locality in the Gladstone Region, Queensland, Australia.

Geography
The Gladstone–Mount Larcom Road runs through from east to west.

History 
The name Aldoga is believed to be an Aboriginal word meaning "wild duck".

References 

Gladstone Region
Localities in Queensland